The Coronet Cinema on Well Hall Road, by Well Hall Roundabout in Well Hall, Eltham, London, is a grade II listed building with Historic England in the streamline moderne style. It was designed by Andrew Mather and Horace Ward for Odeon Theatres and opened in 1936. In 1981 it became the Coronet Cinema but closed in 2000. The building became derelict and remained unused for over a decade, it was eventually converted and extended into 53 flats and a parade of shops including a Tesco Express, and a gym and fitness centre, but the main front of the building remains intact.

References

External links 
https://www.28dayslater.co.uk/the-coronet-cinema-aka-odeon-eltham-jan-2009.t36293

Grade II listed buildings in the Royal Borough of Greenwich
Buildings and structures in Eltham
Grade II listed cinemas
Art Deco architecture in London
Buildings and structures completed in 1936
Odeon Cinemas
Streamline Moderne architecture in the United Kingdom
1936 establishments in England